Belladonna or Bella Donna may refer to:

Plants
 Atropa belladonna, or deadly nightshade
 Amaryllis belladonna, also known as the belladonna lily, a flowering plant

Film and theatre
 Bella Donna, a 1912 play by J. B. Fagan based on the Hichens novel
 Bella Donna (1915 film), based on the play by J. B. Fagan
 Bella Donna (1923 film), a remake of the 1915 film
 Bella Donna (1934 film), a British film directed by Robert Milton, based on the play by J. B. Fagan
 Bella Donna (1983 film), a West German film
 Belladonna (2015 film), a Croatian drama film
 Belladonna of Sadness, a 1973 film, also known as Belladonna

Military
 Krasukha, an electronic warfare system made in Russia

Music
Belladonna (band), from Italy

Albums
 Bella Donna (album), by Stevie Nicks, 1981
 Belladonna (album), by Daniel Lanois, 2005
 Belladonna, by Ian Carr, 1972

Songs
 "Bella Donna", by Beast in Black from the 2021 album Dark Connection
 "Bella Donna", by The Avett Brothers from the 2008 EP The Second Gleam
 "Bella Donna", by Kosheen from the 2012 album Independence
 "Bella Donna", by Stevie Nicks from the album of the same name
 "Bella Donna (Beautiful Lady)", written by Harry B. Smith and associated with the 1923 silent film Bella Donna
 "Belladonna", by John Cooper Clarke from the 1980 album Snap, Crackle & Bop
 "Belladonna", by the Legendary Pink Dots from the 1991 album The Maria Dimension
 "Belladonna", by Madrugada from the 1999 album Industrial Silence
 "Belladonna", by Siouxsie and the Banshees from the 1984 album Hyæna
 "Belladonna", by UFO from the 1976 album No Heavy Petting
 "Belladonna", by Andreas Vollenweider from the 1983 album Caverna Magica
 "Bella, Bella Donna", a single by René Carol, 1953
 "Belladonna", by Ra Ra Riot from the 2019 album Superbloom
 “Belladonna”, by Ava Max from the 2020 album Heaven & Hell

People
 Belladonna (actress) (born 1981), American pornographic actress

Surname
 Giorgio Belladonna (1923–1995), bridge player
 Joey Belladonna (born 1960), vocalist for the band Anthrax and his solo project Belladonna

Characters 
 Bella Donna (comics), either of two Marvel comic book characters
 Bella Donna, a lioness in "The Hunting Ground", an episode of Kimba the White Lion 
 Belladonna, a demonic canine in All Dogs Go to Heaven: The Series and An All Dogs Christmas Carol
 Blake Belladonna, a character in the web series RWBY

Print media
 Bella Donna (novel), a 1909 novel by Robert Hichens
 Belladonna (novel), a 2008 fantasy novel by Anne Bishop
 Belladonna Series, a small press non-profit publisher